Noorderlicht (Dutch for "Northern Light") is a multifaceted and international platform for documentary photography. Based in Groningen, Netherlands, Noorderlicht organizes an annual photo festival, runs a photo gallery, a publishing house, provides an educational programme and discussions, lectures and masterclasses.

History
Noorderlicht Photogallery was established in 1980. Ten years later, the Photofestival was launched, becoming one of the most important international photographic events. In 1991, the festival became a biennale, until 2000, when it was restored as an annual event. From this date, the festival site has alternated between Groningen and Friesland.

Photofestivals
1997: The Garden of Eden - 5th Noorderlicht Photofestival
1999: Wonderland - The borders of documentary photography
2000: Africa Inside - Photography from Africa
2001: Sense of Space - Human experience on space
2002: Mundos Creados - Multifaceted and colourful portrait of Latin America
2003: Global Detail - 300 photographs on globalisation
2004: Nazar: The Arab world
2005: Traces & Omens - 12th Noorderlicht Photofestival
2006: Another Asia - Photography from South and Southeast Asia
2007: Act of Faith - On faith and conflict, ecstasy and excess
2008: Behind Walls - Eastern Europe before 1989
2009: Human Conditions
2010: Land - Country Life in the Urban Age
2011: Metropolis - City Life in the Urban Age
2012: Landscape as the illusion of nature

References

External links

1980 establishments in the Netherlands
Art galleries established in 1980
Buildings and structures in Groningen (city)
Photography festivals
Photography museums and galleries in the Netherlands
Art festivals in the Netherlands
20th-century architecture in the Netherlands